The Benjamin T. Rome School of Music, Drama, and Art is the school of arts with the School of Music, Department of Drama, and Department of Art of The Catholic University of America, located in Washington D.C.

The school is fully accredited by the National Association of Schools of Music.

History 
The Catholic University of America first began offering music courses in 1927. In 1950 a music department was established and in 1965 the department became the School of Music. The school was named the Benjamin T. Rome School of Music in the spring of 1984, in honor of alumnus, Trustee Emeritus, and benefactor, Benjamin T. Rome. In 2018, the school's name changed to Benjamin T. Rome School of Music, Drama, and Art.

Programs of study

Undergraduate programs 
Bachelor of Music degree is offered in composition, music education (with K-12 teacher certification in choral/general, instrumental, or combined), music history and literature (honors program), musical theatre, or performance (orchestral instruments, organ, piano, voice).
Bachelor of Arts in Music, Drama, or Art degree is offered with emphasis in performance, history and literature, drama, art, or no emphasis.
Certificates in Digital Art and Design, Video Production and Digital Storytelling, or Digital Art and Design.
Minors in Music, Drama, and Art for all university programs.

Graduate programs 
Master of Arts program in Musicology (with emphasis in music history or theory); and a joint degree in Music Librarianship: Master of Arts with program in Musicology (music history emphasis) and the Master of Science in Library Science.
Master of Arts in Teaching in Music Education (with K-12 certification and emphasis in choral/general, instrumental, or combined).
Master of Music in Sacred Music (concentrations in choral music, composition, organ).
Master of Music with programs in Composition (with emphasis in concert or stage music); Piano Pedagogy; Vocal Pedagogy; Chamber Music, Orchestral Instruments (Violin, viola, cello, string bass, orchestral woodwind and brass, timpani/percussion, harp, and classical guitar); Piano Performance; Vocal Accompanying; Vocal Performance; Orchestral Conducting.
Graduate Artist Diploma Program (cello, orchestral conducting, piano, violin or voice)
Graduate Music Teacher Certification Program (non-degree K-12 certification with emphasis in choral/general, instrumental, or combined).
Master of Fine Arts in Acting, Directing, or Playwriting.
Master of Arts in Theatre History and Criticism, or Theatre Education.
Graduate Certificate in Creative Teaching through Drama.
Doctor of Musical Arts in Orchestral Instruments, Piano, or Voice.
Ph.D. in Musicology.

Faculty
Faculty includes Simeone Tartaglione, Murry Sidlin, Timothy McDonnell, Jay D. Brock, Marc Bryan Lilley, Sharyn L. Battersby, Grayson Wagstaff, Andrew H. Weaver, Nikita Fitenko, Ivo Kaltchev, Robert A. Baker, Stephen Gorbos, Andrew Earle Simpson, Sharon Christman, Rick Christman, James Hampton, Gail Stewart Beach, Thomas F. Donahue, Rosalind Flynn, Mariettta Hedges, Eleanor Holdridge, Jon Klein, Gary Sloan, Patrick B. Tuite, John G. Figura, Nora M. Heimann, Jonathan Monaghan.

References

External links 
Official website
Benjamin T. Rome biography, The Baltimore Sun

 
Music schools in Washington, D.C.
Colleges and schools of the Catholic University of America
Educational institutions established in 1965
1965 establishments in Washington, D.C.